Marvin John "Jens" Jensen was a Rear Admiral in the United States Navy. A native of Sheboygan, Wisconsin, Jensen was born on July 8, 1908. He graduated from the United States Naval Academy in 1931. While in command he was awarded the Silver Star for his actions during the vessel's war patrol in the Makassar Strait-Celebes Sea area in September and October 1943.

Jensen was promoted to captain effective December 1, 1950. In 1955, he served as the first commanding officer of the fleet oiler . Jensen retired from active duty in 1959 and was advanced to rear admiral on the retired list based on his combat service record.

Jensen died on April 6, 1993 and was interred with his wife Jean Dorothy (Richardson) Jensen at the United States Naval Academy Cemetery. The couple were married on December 23, 1934 in Yuma, Arizona.

References

1908 births
1993 deaths
People from Sheboygan, Wisconsin
United States Naval Academy alumni
Military personnel from Wisconsin
United States submarine commanders
Recipients of the Silver Star
United States Navy personnel of World War II
United States Navy admirals
Burials at the United States Naval Academy Cemetery